Beaver Lake Inverness  is a lake of Inverness County, in north-western Nova Scotia, Canada.

See also
List of lakes in Nova Scotia

References
 National Resources Canada

Lakes of Nova Scotia